Holy See–Russia relations are the bilateral relations between the Holy See and Russia. The Holy See has an Apostolic Nunciature in Moscow.  Russia has a permanent representative to the Holy See based in Rome.

As the Russian Orthodox Church is the largest organization of Eastern Orthodoxy, Holy See–Russia relations partly reflect Catholic Church and Eastern Orthodox Church relations.

Ecumenical relations
Holy See–Russia relations are largely linked to ecumenical relations with the Russian Orthodox Church.

Relationship before the 1917 revolution

Pope Pius IX, who faced his own problems with revolutionary movements in his Church State, first tried to position himself in the middle, strongly opposing revolutionary and violent opposition against the Russian authorities and appealing to them for more Church freedom.

Era of the Soviet Union

John Paul II
There were mixed reactions in Russia on the papacy of Pope John Paul II. Many Russians were happy that John Paul had reduced the influence of atheistic Communism in Eastern Europe and contributed to a rebirth of Christianity in the country. However, many others did not like the fact that the fall of the Soviet Union had also provoked a loss of Russian influence in Eastern Europe. The fact that John Paul was Polish also caused tensions, since there is a historic ethno-religious rivalry between Poland and Russia.

After 1991

After 1991, the Russian government started a dialogue with the Vatican.

The Holy See and the Russian Federation established full diplomatic relations in December 2009 following the meeting between Pope Benedict XVI and Russian President Dimitry Medvedev. President Vladimir Putin helped to arrange a meeting between the Pope and Patriarch Kirill at Havana, Cuba in 2016. The meeting also resulted in the two promulgating a joint declaration.

On 4 July 2019, however, it was revealed that tensions still remained between the Vatican and Russia, with the Russian Orthodox Church and Ukrainian conflict serving as the major causes of these tensions. Despite holding a "cordial" meeting with Russian President Vladimir Putin in the Vatican, Pope Francis stated it is unlikely that he will visit Russia unless Putin agrees to not include the Russian Orthodox Church in the invitation, which Putin stated would be unlikely as well. Pope Francis has also declared support for the Ukrainian Greek Catholic Church, which has expressed opposition to Putin and the Russian Orthodox Church and also the 2016 joint declaration.

See also
 Foreign relations of the Holy See
 Foreign relations of Russia
 Joint Declaration of Pope Francis and Patriarch Kirill
 Edmund A. Walsh S.J.
 Michel d'Herbigny S.J.
 Augustin Bea S.J.

References

External links
  Documents on the Holy See – Russia relationship from the Russian Ministry of Foreign Affairs
 Benedict XVI receives President of the Russian Federation Video of meeting between Pope Benedict XVI and President Dmitry Medvedev from Official YouTube channel of the Vatican. 3 December 2009, Retrieved 20 November 2010

 
Russia
Bilateral relations of Russia